

Belgium
Belgian Congo – Pierre Ryckmans, Governor-General of the Belgian Congo (1934–1946)

France
 French Somaliland –
 Jules Marcel de Coppet, Governor of French Somaliland (1934–1935)
 Achille Louis Auguste Silvestre, Governor of French Somaliland (1935)
 Armand Léon Annet, Governor of French Somaliland (1935–1937)
 Dahomey
 Jean Desanti, acting Lieutenant-Governor of Dahomey (1934–1935)
 Maurice-Léon Bourgine, Lieutenant-Governor of Dahomey (1935–1937)
French Establishments in Oceania –
 Michel Lucien Montagné, Governor of French Establishments in Oceania (1933–1935)
 Henri Sautot, Acting Governor of French Establishments in Oceania (1935–1937)
Guinea –
 Joseph Vadier, Lieutenant-Governor of Guinea (1933–1935)
 Louis Placide Blacher, acting Lieutenant-Governor of Guinea (1935)
 Joseph Vadier, Lieutenant-Governor of Guinea (1935–1936)

Netherlands
 Dutch East Indies – Bonifacius Cornelis de Jonge, Governor-General of the Dutch East Indies (1931–1936)

Japan
 Karafuto – Takeshi Imamura, Governor-General of Karafuto (5 July 1932 – 7 May 1938)
 Korea – Kazushige Ugaki, Governor-General of Korea (1931–1936)
 Taiwan – Kenzō Nakagawa, Governor-General of Taiwan (27 May 1932 – September 1936)

Portugal
 Angola –
 Júlio Garcês de Lencastre, High Commissioner of Angola (1934–1935)
 António Lopes Matheus, High Commissioner of Angola (1935–1939)

United Kingdom
 The Bahamas – Sir Charles Dundas, Governor of The Bahamas (1934–1940)
 Bechuanaland – Charles Fernand Rey, Resident Commissioner of Bechuanaland (1930–1937)
 British Guiana –
 Sir Edward Brandis Denham, Governor of British Guiana (1930–1935)
 Sir Geoffry Northcote, Governor of British Guiana (1935–1937)
 Ceylon – Sir Reginald Edward Stubbs, Governor of Ceylon (1933–1937)
 Cyprus – Sir Herbert Richmond Palmer, Governor of Cyprus (1933–1939)
 Hong Kong –
 Sir William Peel, Governor of Hong Kong (1930–1935)
 Sir Andrew Caldecott, Governor of Hong Kong (1935–1940)
 India – The Earl of Willingdon, Viceroy of India (1931–1936)
 Jamaica – Sir Edward Brandis Denham, Governor of Jamaica (1935–1938)
 Kenya – Sir Joseph Aloysius Byrne, Governor of Kenya (1931–1936)
 Malta Colony – David Campbell, Governor of Malta (1931–1936)
 Northern Rhodesia –
 Sir Ronald Storrs, Governor of Northern Rhodesia (1932–1935)
 Sir Hubert Winthrop Young, Governor of Northern Rhodesia (1935–1938)
 Nyasaland – Sir Harold Baxter Kittermaster, Governor of Nyasaland (1934–1939)
 Southern Rhodesia –
 Sir Fraser Russell, Governor of Southern Rhodesia (1934–1935)
 Sir Herbert Stanley, Governor of Southern Rhodesia (1935–1942)
 Straits Settlements – Sir Shenton Thomas, Governor of the Straits Settlements (1934–1942)
 Uganda Protectorate –
 Sir Bernard Henry Bourdillon, Governor of Uganda (1932–1935)
 Sir Philip Euen Mitchell, Governor of Uganda (1935–1940)

Colonial governors
Colonial governors
1935